Abel Hayes  (born 1866) was a Welsh international footballer. He was part of the Wrexham squad from 1890–1894.

He was part of the Wales national football team between 1890 and 1894, playing 2 matches. He played his first match on 8 February 1890 against Ireland and his last match on 24 February 1894 against Ireland.

See also
 List of Wales international footballers (alphabetical)

References

1866 births
Wrexham A.F.C. players
Welsh footballers
Wales international footballers
Place of birth missing
Date of death missing
Association footballers not categorized by position